Elizabeth Woodman (née Abrahams; May 14, 1930 – January 2, 2018) was an American ceramic artist.

Early life and education 
Betty Woodman was born in Norwalk, Connecticut, to Minnie and Henry Abrahams.  Her parents were progressive socialists and her mother promoted a feminist viewpoint. During seventh grade, stifled by the home economics courses young women were relegated to, she successfully fought her way into a woodshop class, wherein she learned to use a lathe. Betty started pottery classes at age 16 and immediately took to clay.  She attended the School for American Craftsmen at Alfred University in New York from 1948 until 1950.

Career 
Woodman began her career in the 1950s as a production potter. Her career moved from functional pottery to fresh and exuberant art culminating in a retrospective show at the Metropolitan Museum of Art in New York in 2006, the first such retrospective for a living, female ceramicist, and a solo show at the Institute of Contemporary Arts in London in 2016 with the title Theatre of the Domestic. She was a professor of art at the University of Colorado Boulder from 1978-1998. Following her daughter's death in 1981, Woodman's work subsequently shifted, evolving from functional pottery to the more abstract, thus transforming her career. She received an honorary doctorate from CU in 2007. Woodman convinced city of Boulder officials in the 1950s to fund the Pottery Lab, making it one of the first recreational pottery programs in the U.S.  Her vision was to have students make pottery for fun but also develop their craft into a career.  The Pottery Lab's creation resulted in around 100 kilns being constructed in the Boulder area.

Family 
Betty Woodman met George Woodman in a pottery class she was teaching in Boston in 1950.  They married in 1953.  George Woodman was a painter and photographer.  He headed the University of Colorado Boulder art department. He died in March 2017.  Betty and George Woodman had two children.  Their daughter, Francesca Woodman, was a photographer who died by suicide in 1981 at age 22. Their son, Charles Woodman, is an artist.

Awards and honors
Woodman's awards and honors include: 
 National Endowment for the Arts Fellowships (1980,1986) 
 Rockefeller Foundation Fellowship at the Bellagio Study Center, Bellagio, Italy (1995) 
 Fulbright-Hays Scholarship to Florence Italy (1996) 
 Doctor of Fine Arts Honors Causa from the Nova Scotia College of Art and Design (2006) 
 Doctor of Human Letters Honoris Causa from the University of Colorado Boulder (2007) 
 Honorary Doctorate of Fine Arts from the Rhode Island School of Design (2009) 
 Gold Medal for Consummate Craftmanship, American Craft Council Awards (2014)

Exhibitions
Woodman exhibited at museums and galleries in the US and internationally, including:
 'Betty Woodman' at the Stedelijk Museum, Amsterdam (1996)
 'Betty Woodman' at the Daum Museum of Contemporary Art, Sedalia, MO (2002)
 'Theaters of Betty Woodman' at the Museu Nacional do Azulejo, Lisbon (2005) and the Musée Ariana, Geneva (2006)
 'The Art of Betty Woodman' a retrospective exhibition of her career at the Metropolitan Museum of Art, New York (2006)
 'Betty Woodman: Roman Fresco/Pleasures and Places' first exhibited at the American Academy in Rome (2010)
 'Betty Woodman: Theatre of the Domestic' at the Institute of Contemporary Arts in London, 2016

Collections
Woodman's work is included in public collections, including:
 Museum of Fine Arts, Boston
 Denver Art Museum, Denver, CO
 Metropolitan Museum of Art, New York
 Musée des Arts Décoratifs, Paris
 Museum of Modern Art, New York 
 Whitney Museum of American Art, New York
 National Gallery of Art, Washington D.C.
 Philadelphia Museum of Art, Philadelphia, PA
 Victoria and Albert Museum, London
Minneapolis Institute of Art
Smithsonian American Art Museum (SAAM)  Pillow Pitcher  was acquired by SAAM as part of the Renwick Gallery's 50th Anniversary Campaign.

Other contributions
In the 1991 documentary Thinking Out Loud, Woodman is interviewed by curator and painter John Perreault. In 2006 the monograph, Betty Woodman, was produced in conjunction with her retrospective at the Metropolitan Museum of Art, and it includes curatorial essays by Janet Koplos, Barry Schwabsky, and Arthur Danto.

References

Bibliography

 The Ceramics of Betty Woodman, exhibition catalogue, Freedman Gallery, Albright College,Reading, 1986.
 Berlind, Robert: Betty Woodman: Between Sculpture and Painting, exhibition catalogue, Blanden Memorial Art Museum, Fort Dodge, Iowa, 1999.
 Danto, Arthus C/Koplos, Janet/Schwabsky, Barry: Betty Woodman, Monacelli Press, New York, 2006.

External links
 Betty Woodman at 15th Street Gallery

1930 births
2018 deaths
American women ceramists
Artists from Colorado
American ceramists
Jewish American artists
American potters
20th-century American women artists
Women potters
21st-century American Jews
21st-century American women
People from Norwalk, Connecticut